The National Student Clearinghouse is an educational nonprofit that provides educational reporting, verification, and research services to North American colleges and universities. NSC has a nationwide network of ~3,600 colleges, representing 97 percent of the postsecondary enrollment. It was incorporated in Herndon, Virginia on July 2, 1993. Its services help schools stay in compliance with the Family Educational Rights and Privacy Act and the Higher Education Act.

The research arm of the Clearinghouse publishes relevant research. Its reports include a bi-annual report on US higher education enrollment, mobility, completion, and other student outcomes that are gleaned from the Clearinghouse data.

References

External links
 

Higher education in the United States
Research institutes established in 1993
Educational institutions established in 1993
American companies established in 1993
1993 establishments in Virginia
Herndon, Virginia
Statistics of education